Two Pesos was a Tex-Mex restaurant chain in the U.S. state of Texas that opened in 1982 in Houston.  It was similar to Taco Cabana but Two Pesos never opened in Taco Cabana's home market of San Antonio.  The Two Pesos chain was sold to Taco Cabana in 1993 after losing a drawn-out trade dress suit that appeared before the United States Supreme Court.

History 
Two Pesos was started in 1985 by Houston restaurateur Marno McDermot, who had been in negotiations with Taco Cabana's management to take the patio-restaurant chain nationwide.  When Taco Cabana's founding Stehling brothers rejected his advances, McDermot decided to open up his own chain of similarly themed patio-dining Tex-Mex restaurants under the Two Pesos name.  When Taco Cabana entered the Houston market, they sued Two Pesos for stealing their business concepts and "trade dress." After many appeals, the case went to the Supreme Court, which in 1992 ruled in Two Pesos, Inc. v. Taco Cabana, Inc. in favor of Taco Cabana. The Two Pesos owners sold to Taco Cabana the following year rather than making the changes required by the judgment.

References

1982 establishments in Texas
1993 disestablishments in Texas
Defunct restaurant chains in the United States
Fast-food Mexican restaurants
Restaurants disestablished in 1993
Restaurants established in 1982
Restaurants in Houston